The Lufu River or Luvo River is a river of Angola and the Democratic Republic of the Congo. It is a left tributary of the Congo River.

Location

Part of the upper section of the Lufu River, and its tributary the Lungezi River, defines the border between the DRC and Angola to the south.
From the border it flows NNW to the town of Lufu, then NW to the Congo River, which it enters from the east at the Inga Falls.

The border section is crossed by illegal immigrants from the Democratic Republic of the Congo to Angola.
On market days thousands of people cross the border at the Lufu entry post.

Notes

Sources

Rivers of the Democratic Republic of the Congo
Rivers of Angola
International rivers of Africa
Angola–Democratic Republic of the Congo border
Border rivers